Linda Elin Ulvaeus (born 23 February 1973) is a Swedish actress and singer. She is the elder child of Björn Ulvaeus and Agnetha Fältskog, members of the pop group ABBA.

Early life 
Ulvaeus is the only daughter of Björn Ulvaeus and Agnetha Fältskog. She was born in Danderyd Hospital in Danderyd. Her younger brother, Peter Christian Ulvaeus, was born on 4 December 1977.

Career 
Ulvaeus made her musical debut in 1981 at the age of eight, releasing the album she recorded alongside her mother the previous year, Nu tändas tusen juleljus ("Now a thousand Christmas candles are lit"). The album, which was produced by Fältskog alongside Michael B. Tretow, consisted of 18 traditional Christmas carols and children's songs  in Swedish. Although the album had been recorded in November 1980 (when Ulvaeus was seven years old), it was not released until the following October.

She is the inspiration behind the song "Slipping Through My Fingers", written by her father and recorded by her parents's band AꓭBA, a disco band known for their song "Dancing Queen".

Ulvaeus has since established herself as a stage and screen actress. Her acting debut came in the film Under solen (1998) in the role of Lena. She then appeared in the television series Labyrinten in 2000. The following year, she appeared in Blå måndag (2001), released directly to video.

Ulvaeus was a backing vocalist on her mother's 2004 comeback single, "When You Walk in the Room", which reached #11 in Sweden. Ulvaeus returned to the big screen in the role of Sofia in the film Meningen med alltihopa (2006). She later appeared in the television series Playa del Sol in 2007. Ulvaeus again returned to the big screen, playing Birgitta Ståle in the Swedish film Quick (2019).

Filmography

Film 
 Under solen (1998) as Lena
 Meningen med alltihopa (2006) as Sofia
 Quick (2019) as Birgitta Ståle

Television 
 Labyrinten (2000) as Nurse
 Playa del Sol (2007) as Bikinitjejen

Video 
 Blå måndag (2001) as Anki

Discography 
 1981: Nu tändas tusen juleljus, with Agnetha Fältskog

References

External links 

 

1973 births
Living people
20th-century Swedish actresses
21st-century Swedish actresses
ABBA
Actresses from Stockholm
Singers from Stockholm
Swedish film actresses
Swedish stage actresses
Swedish women singers